The Boston Harbor Hotel is a luxury hotel overlooking Boston Harbor and the Rose Kennedy Greenway. It is a member of Preferred Hotels & Resorts Worldwide.

The hotel is the principal occupant of the Rowes Wharf building, completed in 1987, and designed by Adrian Smith while he was working for Skidmore, Owings and Merrill (SOM).

References

Hotels in Boston
1987 establishments in Massachusetts
Hotels established in 1987
Hotel buildings completed in 1987